Farmhaven is an unincorporated community located in Madison County, Mississippi.

Farmhaven is located within the Jackson Metropolitan Statistical Area. Notable people from Farmhhaven include Flonzie Brown Wright.

References

Unincorporated communities in Madison County, Mississippi
Unincorporated communities in Mississippi